Paul James McManus (born 22 April 1990) is an English footballer.

Career

McManus was a product of Chester City's youth system and a prolific scoring record for the youth and reserve sides persuaded Bobby Williamson to hand McManus a professional contract on 2 October 2007. Highlights of his early time at the club included scoring the shock winner for Chester's youngsters against Tottenham Hotspur in the FA Youth Cup in December 2006 and a hat-trick against Carlisle United in a reserve fixture in September 2007.

He made his Football League debut as a late substitute in a 3–1 home win over Shrewsbury Town on 7 October 2007, becoming the first player born in the 1990s to make a first-team appearance for Chester. He is one of several homegrown players to appear for the first-team this season. He made his first starting appearance in the first–team in a Football League Trophy tie away at Carlisle United two nights later and remained in the first–team squad for most of the season. In the closing weeks of the 2007–2008 season he played regularly in attack, scoring his first league goal in a 2–1 loss to Lincoln City on 12 April 2008.

The following season saw McManus scored successive equalisers for Chester against Shrewsbury Town and Luton Town in September but he was allowed to move to Bangor City shortly before the transfer window closed on 2 February 2009. He made 14 appearances during the remainder of the 2008–09 season and also won the Welsh Cup and played in the final of the Welsh League Cup. At the end of the season, he was released by Bangor at the end of the season, moving to Airbus UK Broughton.

In January 2012 he joined Rhyl.

In 2016 McManus signed for Runcorn Town. In February 2019 he became player-manager on a caretaker basis, and was appointed as permanent player-manager prior to the final game of the season.

References

https://web.archive.org/web/20110605113349/http://www.airbusfc.com/index.php/first-team/squad-and-stats/stat-attack

External links

Welsh Premier profile

1990 births
Living people
Footballers from Liverpool
English footballers
Association football forwards
Chester City F.C. players
Bangor City F.C. players
Airbus UK Broughton F.C. players
English Football League players
Cymru Premier players
Rhyl F.C. players
Flint Town United F.C. players
Cymru Alliance players